The Charles Krug House, also known as the Krug House, is a residence at 103 N. Douglas Street, Glendive, Montana, US, designed by St. Louis, Missouri-based architect Herbert C. Chivers (1869-1946).  It was listed on the National Register of Historic Places in 1976.

Charles Krug (1846–1929) was a successful rancher and president of the Merchants National Bank. In 1900 at age 54, Krug married Annie A Hackney (1868-1950), the mother of two daughters.  They had five more children together.  The house was built in 1906 to accommodate the large family.

The NRHP nomination states: "The Krug House is a grand expression of a by-gone age, reminding our current generation of the integrity and perseverance of Charles Krug, and of the timeless values of fine construction that are represented in this eastern Montana home."

References

Houses on the National Register of Historic Places in Montana
Houses completed in 1907
Houses in Dawson County, Montana
National Register of Historic Places in Dawson County, Montana